Kevin Beahan (9 April 1933 – 24 July 2022) was an Irish Gaelic footballer who played for a number of club sides, including St Mary's, and at inter-county level with the Louth senior football team.

Career
Beahan first played Gaelic football at St Patrick's Grammar School in Armagh. During his time there he won consecutive Ulster Colleges JFC titles and also lined out in the MacRory Cup. At club level, Beahan won consecutive Louth MFC titles with the St Mary's club in Ardee before later winning five Louth SFC titles. He also experienced success as a hurler, winning three Louth SHC titles with Naomh Colmcille, while he also lined out with the Seán McDermotts club in Dublin.

Beahan's performances for club and college resulted in him being selected for the Louth minor football team and he won a Leinster MFC medal in 1951. He progressed onto the senior team and was at midfield for the 1–09 to 1–07 defeat of Cork in the 1957 All-Ireland final. Beahan also lined out with Leinster and was a two-time Railway Cup medallist.

Death
Beahan died on 24 July 2022, aged 89.

Honours
St Patrick's Grammar School
Ulster Colleges Junior Football Championship: 1949, 1950

Naomh Colmcille
Louth Senior Hurling Championship: 1955, 1958, 1960

St Mary's
Louth Senior Football Championship: 1951, 1955, 1956, 1960, 1968
Louth Minor Football Championship: 1950, 1951

Louth
All-Ireland Senior Football Championship: 1957
Leinster Senior Football Championship: 1957
Leinster Minor Football Championship: 1951

Leinster
Railway Cup: 1959, 1963

References

1933 births
2022 deaths
Irish accountants
Leinster inter-provincial Gaelic footballers
Louth inter-county Gaelic footballers
St Mary's (Louth) Gaelic footballers